USS Bowen (DE-1079/FF-1079) was a  of the United States Navy. She was named for Vice Admiral Harold G. Bowen, Sr. (1883–1965), former chief of the Naval Research Laboratory and the Office of Naval Research, who was deceased at the time of her commissioning. Admiral Bowen's son and namesake, Harold G. Bowen, Jr., who also retired as a vice admiral, presided over the U.S. Navy's 1969 inquiry into the Pueblo incident.

Service history
Bowen was built by Avondale Shipyard at Westwego, Louisiana. Bowen was laid down on 11 July 1969 and launched on 2 May 1970. The frigate was delivered on 17 May 1971. She was commissioned on 22 May 1971.

Commanded by Commander Arthur Drennan, Bowen was part of the expeditionary force deployed off the coast of Beirut during the Lebanese Civil War. In early September 1983, United States Marines at the Beirut International Airport came under artillery fire. After repeated warnings, Bowen was ordered to fire in defense of the Marines. Bowens action received international media attention as the ship became the first warship to engage in hostile fire in the Mediterranean Sea since World War II. In all, Bowen made six firing runs, firing a total of 75 shells at hostile targets. For their actions, Bowens crew was awarded the Navy Unit Commendation, the Navy Expeditionary Medal and proudly adopted the slogan "First to Shoot in Beirut". In early October 1983, after one month on the "Gun Line", Bowen was relieved by the battleship .

In 1992, Bowen was re-designated as a training ship, designated as a FFT and started training naval reservists. She was also converted to allow for the testing and evaluation of women aboard combatant ships. The successful program led to woman being assigned to "Man of War" ships throughout the fleets.

Bowen was decommissioned on 30 June 1994 and struck from the Naval Vessel Register on 11 January 1995.  She was immediately re-commissioned as the Akdeniz (F-257), of the Turkish Navy.

Bowen was disposed of through the Security Assistance Program (SAP), transferred, Foreign Assistance Act (FAA) Section 516, Southern Region Amendment, to Turkey 22 February 2002. She served there as Akdeniz (F-257) until 2011.

External links
 
 
 NavSource images
 Navysite.de
 Losbarcosdeeugenio.com
 

Ships built in Bridge City, Louisiana
Knox-class frigates
1970 ships
Ships transferred from the United States Navy to the Turkish Navy
Cold War frigates and destroyer escorts of the United States